Harnois is a surname. Notable people with the surname include:

Pauline Georgette Harnois, wife of Rene Gagnon
Elisabeth Harnois (born 1979/1980), American actress
Marlène Harnois (born 1986), French taekwondo practitioner